Kamar Qayah (also Romanized as Kamar Qayyah; also known as Qūrt Dū) is a village in Azadlu Rural District, Muran District, Germi County, Ardabil Province, Iran. At the 2006 census, its population was 227, in 42 families.

References 

Towns and villages in Germi County